Heikki Aho (born 16 March 1983) is a retired Finnish footballer, who played as a defender. He represented Tampere United and won three Finnish championships before moving to FF Jaro for the 2009 season.

References
Guardian Football

1983 births
Living people
Finnish footballers
People from Muurame
Tampere United players
FF Jaro players
Veikkausliiga players
Association football defenders
Sportspeople from Central Finland